Lavukaleve is one of the four Central Solomons languages of the Solomon Islands. It is thus assumed to be the descendant of the languages spoken in the Solomon Islands before the spread of the much more numerous Austronesian languages. The name Lavukaleve derives from the ethnonym Lavukal. The Lavukals are the indigenous peoples of the Russell Islands, part of the Solomon Islands Central Province. A comprehensive grammatical description of Lavukaleve was published by the linguist Angela Terrill in 2003.

Lavukaleve is spoken in about eleven main villages. It used to be spoken predominantly on Pavuvu, the largest island, but the speakers were forcefully relocated by the British to the smaller islands in order to make way for plantations.

Phonology

Consonants 

 Sounds /b, d/ are prenasalized [ᵐb, ⁿd] in intervocalic positions.
 [p] only occurs in loanwords from Pijin.
 /t, k/ can also be heard as aspirated [tʰ, kʰ] in free variation.
 /r/ can also be heard as a tap [ɾ] or glide [ɹ] in free variation.

Vowels 

 Vowels /i, o/ can be heard as [ɪ, ɔ] when in unstressed syllables.

See also
East Papuan languages

References

External links

Anglican Morning Prayer, Evening Prayer, Eucharistic prayers and Catechism in Lavukaleve from Project Canterbury, transcribed by Richard Mammana
 Hai-Foiae Sevo Lavu Kaleve Ena: A Liturgy for Melanesia in Lavukaleve (1973)
 Materials on Lavukaleve are included in the open access Arthur Capell collections (AC1 and AC2) held by Paradisec.

Languages of the Solomon Islands

Central Solomon languages